Igor Alekseyevich Pakhomenko (born 10 June 1992) is a Russian gymnast. He competed for the national team at the 2012 Summer Olympics in the Men's artistic team all-around.

See also
List of Olympic male artistic gymnasts for Russia

References

Russian male artistic gymnasts
Living people
Olympic gymnasts of Russia
Gymnasts at the 2012 Summer Olympics
Sportspeople from Novosibirsk
1992 births
21st-century Russian people